Darío Antonio Flores Bistolfi (born February 6, 1984) is a Uruguayan footballer, who plays for Central Español.

Career
Born in Montevideo, Flores began his career with River Plate (Uruguay) of the Uruguayan Primera División. In winter 2005–06 he joined Peñarol. After one season for Peñarol he moved to Montevideo Wanderers in January 2007.

In February 2008 Flores returned to his youth club River Plate. On 7 January 2009, he signed for CFR Cluj.

Personal life
His brother, Robert Flores, is also a professional footballer.

Honours
Cupa României: 2008–09

References

External links
Darío Flores at Soccerway

1984 births
Living people
Association football defenders
Uruguayan footballers
Uruguayan expatriate footballers
Club Atlético River Plate (Montevideo) players
Peñarol players
CFR Cluj players
Club Deportivo Palestino footballers
Montevideo Wanderers F.C. players
Racing Club de Montevideo players
Rampla Juniors players
Cerro Largo F.C. players
Juventud de Las Piedras players
A.C. Perugia Calcio players
F.C. Matera players
C.S.D. Municipal players
A.C.C.D. Mineros de Guayana players
C.A. Cerro players
Pontevedra CF footballers
Boston River players
Central Español players
Atenas de San Carlos players
Uruguayan Primera División players
Liga I players
Serie B players
Serie C players
Chilean Primera División players
Liga Nacional de Fútbol de Guatemala players
Segunda División B players
Uruguayan expatriate sportspeople in Chile
Uruguayan expatriate sportspeople in Romania
Uruguayan expatriate sportspeople in Italy
Uruguayan expatriate sportspeople in Spain
Expatriate footballers in Chile
Expatriate footballers in Romania
Expatriate footballers in Italy
Expatriate footballers in Spain